MLS Direct Kick was an out-of-market sports package distributed by most cable and satellite providers in North America. As of the 2011 season, package subscribers will be able to watch up to 221 Major League Soccer regular season games as well as some MLS Cup playoff matches. The target market for this package (based on advertisements) is soccer fans who are unable to see games because they have moved out of that team's market. It has been superseded by MLS Season Pass.

Availability
MLS Direct Kick is available with these cable and satellite providers:
 United States
 DirecTV
 In Demand
 Charter Communications
 Cox Communications
 Frontier Communications
 Avail-TVN

Blackout restrictions
If a local MLS team is playing and the game is being seen locally, the associated feed on MLS Direct Kick is blacked out.  Note also the games being televised on Fox/Fox Sports 1, ESPN/ESPN 2/ESPN Deportes, and/or Univision/Unimás/TUDN telecasts are not available in the package due to the rights of those games being purchased by the previous television stations prior to the beginning of the season.

History
The MLS Direct Kick Package was known as The MLS/ESPN Shootout Package in the early years of MLS. The name change occurred prior to the 2005 MLS season.

See also
NFL Sunday Ticket
MLB Extra Innings
NBA League Pass
NHL Center Ice
NASCAR Hot Pass

References

External links
 Official DirecTV site
 Official Dish Network site
 Official In Demand site
 MLS official site

Satellite television
Direct Kick
Out-of-market sports packages